Sweethearts was a romance comic book series published by Fawcett Publications from October 1948 to 1953, and continued by Charlton Comics from 1954 to 1973.  It was the first monthly romance comic book, and a great commercial success. Fawcett followed the title with other monthly romance titles including Life Story (1949), Cowboy Love (1949), and Romantic Secrets (1950).

Because of postal regulations, the title debuted as Sweethearts #68, a numerical continuation of Fawcett's Captain Midnight which ended with issue #67. The title was not heavily marketed in its infancy and did not appear in the Fawcett comics title list on the first pages of its Captain Marvel and Whiz Comics.

The book exhibited front cover photos of happy couples, or lovely girls, but never men alone. The back cover featured a large photo of a male movie star labelled in the first issue "My Romance of the Month", and, with the second issue, "Dream Beau of the Month".  The first photo was Robert Mitchum and the second Glenn Ford. While the front cover displayed a happy scene of young love, story titles listed beneath the cover photo hinted at drama and conflict: "Beauty was My Snare", "Betrayed by My Temper" and "I Led Him On" are just a few.

Many stories were drawn by Mary Marvel artist Marc Swayze, and were monotonously repetitive: erring female learns about life from the man she finally steadies or weds.

Charlton Comics acquired the rights to much of Fawcett's title, story, and character inventory in 1954 when Fawcett left comic book publication, and Charlton published Sweethearts until 1973.

References

External links

 

1948 comics debuts
1973 comics endings
Comics magazines published in the United States
Monthly magazines published in the United States
Defunct American comics
Charlton Comics titles
Fawcett Comics titles
Magazines established in 1948
Magazines disestablished in 1973
Romance comics